Air Marshal David Manson Crooks,  (8 December 1931 – 9 March 2022) was a senior commander of the Royal New Zealand Air Force. He was Chief of the Air Staff from April 1983 to October 1986 and Chief of the Defence Staff thereafter until 1987 when he retired.

Crooks was appointed an Officer of the Order of the British Empire in the 1969 Queen's Birthday Honours, and a Companion of the Order of the Bath in the 1985 New Year Honours.

Crooks retired from the Royal New Zealand Air Force in 1987. In retirement he served on the board of the RNZAF Museum Trust. He died in Wellington on 9 March 2022, at the age of 90.

References

 

 

 

1931 births
2022 deaths
Royal New Zealand Air Force air marshals
Chiefs of Defence Force (New Zealand)
New Zealand Officers of the Order of the British Empire
New Zealand Companions of the Order of the Bath
People from Rangiora
New Zealand military personnel of the Vietnam War